Porcupine meatballs are an American casserole dish of ground beef and rice meatballs cooked in tomato sauce. They were a staple during the Great Depression requiring only a few basic ingredients: ground beef, uncooked long-grain rice, onion, and canned tomato soup. The name comes from the appearance of the meatballs, which appear prickly when the rice pokes out of them as they cook, resembling a porcupine.

Porcupine meatballs can be made in the slow cooker or baked. They can be served with relish such as red cabbage or radish and mashed potatoes. Leftovers can be made into sandwiches.

History
To make the dish the rice meatballs were pan-seared and slowly simmered in canned tomato soup. The dish continued to be popular into the 1970s. The recipe appears as "rice meat balls" in the 1918 cookbook "Conservation Recipes". 

Other ingredients could be added to the meatballs like green pepper, mustard, celery, horseradish, Worcestershire sauce, ketchup, or other seasonings. The simple tomato sauce made with canned soup could be enriched with molasses and seasoned with chili powder and cumin. A later recipe from 1969 for "Porcupine meatballs paprika" replaces tomato soup with cream of mushroom, and adds other ingredients like mustard, or sour cream and paprika. "Porcupine meatballs Chinois" was a variation influenced by Chinese cooking techniques and ingredients. Served with peach sauce, the Chinois meatballs are made with ground pork, shrimp, rice and green onion, seasoned with soy sauce and sherry, and steamed instead of being cooked in sauce.

References

External links

Foods and Nutrition:Ground Beef, Virginia Cooperative Extension Service, August 1980

American rice dishes
Great Depression in the United States
Meatballs
Tomato dishes
Historical foods in American cuisine
Casserole dishes
American casseroles